Sultan Syed Shah Mutaharuddin Suhrawardi (969–1039), also called Dada Hayat Mir Qalandar or Nathar Wali or Nadir Shah, was a Muslim mystic and preacher from the Middle East who migrated to Tamil Nadu in the 11th-century, where he travelled from area to area to preach the faith of Islam to the locals. He came to Trichy in the 11th century; his shrine is located in Tiruchirapalli, Tamil Nadu, which according to legend is atop the grave of the three-headed Hindu demon Tiriasuran whom Dada killed.

Early life 
According to the sources Tabl-e-Aalam Badshah was born as Syed Mutaharuddin in Anatolia region to the King of Bahanasa King Ahmed Kabeer and Syeda Fathimunnisa (Descendants of Prophet Muhammad through Ali and Husayn ibn Ali). He had an younger brother Syed Jalaluddin who became the King after he left the Kingdom for the journey of Sufism.

Life in Tiruchirapalli 

Nathar Wali left his comfortable life in search of Murshid (spiritual preceptor). He was a Qalandar (unmarried saint) came to India along with 900 Qalandars to spread Islam, before coming to India he became the Mureed (Student) to Ibrahim Garamseel near Pakistan region, then after he travelled his journey towards different parts of India and at last he reached to Trichy and settled there. During this time Tiruchirappalli was a part of the Chola Empire under the reign of Rajendra I although Nathar Wali has never interacted with him. He iwas said to have performed miracles. Along with his qalandars, he came to Tiruchirapuram, which is now known as Tiruchirappalli, and led a religious life with his qalandars in a flower garden there.

Disciples of Dada Hayat Mir Qalandar 
 Syed Shams Peer Tanjore
 Syed Shams Mansoor Tanjore 
 Syed Shamsuddin "Shams Goya"
 Syed Shamsullah "Shams Farrah"
 Syed Baba Fakhruddin
 Syed Shah Hayder Wali
 Syed Shah Khadir Wali "Syed Shahul Hamid"
 Syed Abdur Rahman Siddiqi
 Syed Rahmatullah Baba

Death 

He died in Tiruchirappalli in 1039 and was buried in the city and a mosque constructed at the spot. Long after his death, Tiruchirappalli is still referred to by his followers as "Natharnagar". Nathar Vali died on the 15th of the month of Ramadan. This date is commemorated as his urs (death-day), and the first 17 days of Ramadan are celebrated in his honor, by Muslims, Christians, and Hindus, one the eve of the Kanduri festival, where they seek his blessings.

References 

Indian Sufi saints
Year of birth unknown
969 births
1039 deaths
Muslim missionaries
Islam in Tamil Nadu
10th-century Indian people
Muslim saints